China Airlines Flight 825 was a scheduled China Airlines passenger flight from Taipei's Songshan Airport to Kai Tak Airport, Hong Kong. On 20 November 1971, a Sud Aviation SE-210 operating this route disintegrated in midair over the Penghu islands, killing all 25 onboard.

Aircraft 

The aircraft involved was a Sud Aviation SE-210 Caravelle III built in March 1962, new to Swissair with registration HB-ICT. The aircraft was involved in a separate accident as Swissair Flight 142, (Callsign “SWISSAIR 142”) on 25 April 1962, where it experienced problems with its nose landing gear enroute from Geneva, Switzerland to Paris, France. Due to unsatisfactory maintenance and a lack of fuel, the flight was diverted by air traffic control (ATC) to Zurich Airport. The aircraft then landed at Zurich with the nose gear retracted, causing a fire to break out underneath the cockpit. All 72 people on board were evacuated safely. The aircraft was repaired and returned to service.

On 12 January 1971, the aircraft was transferred to China Airlines.

Events 
On 20 November 1971 prior to the incident, the aircraft operated as China Airlines Flight 823 from Osaka, Japan, to Taipei via Naha and completed this flight without incident.

The aircraft then departed Taipei as China Airlines Flight 825 at 21:02 local time and was expected to arrive at Kai Tak Airport at 22:50. The captain was Wei Buxiao and the first officer was Ju Jiping. There were 10 passengers on board other than the Taiwanese passengers: 3 Japanese, 3 Iranians, 2 Singaporeans, 1 Vietnamese, and 1 Brazilian, Brazil's ambassador to Taiwan at the time.

The aircraft crashed into the Taiwan Strait, killing all 17 passengers and 8 crew members on board.

The Taiwan Garrison Command investigated the crash, which concluded that the in-flight break up was the result of a terrorist bomb explosion. The reasons for the bombing could not be determined.

References 

1971 in Taiwan
Airliner accidents and incidents caused by in-flight structural failure
Airliner accidents and incidents involving in-flight depressurization
Airliner bombings
China Airlines accidents and incidents
Accidents and incidents involving the Sud Aviation Caravelle
Aviation accidents and incidents in 1971
Mass murder in 1971